Glen Ridge is a town in Palm Beach County, Florida, United States. The population was 219 at the 2010 census. As of 2018, the population recorded by the U.S. Census Bureau was 243.

History

Glen Ridge was incorporated in 1947. The town received its name from a wooded canal bank which was said to resemble a glen.

Geography

Glen Ridge is located at  (26.673493, –80.075913).

Demographics

As of the census of 2000, there were 276 people, 96 households, and 67 families residing in the town. The racial makeup of the town was 81.88% White (of which 71.4% were Non-Hispanic White,) 9.06% African American, 0.72% Native American, 0.36% Asian, and 7.97% from two or more races. Hispanic or Latino of any race were 10.87% of the population.

There were 96 households, out of which 36.5% had children under the age of 18 living with them, 50.0% were married couples living together, 10.4% had a female householder with no husband present, and 29.2% were non-families. 18.8% of all households were made up of individuals, and 8.3% had someone living alone who was 65 years of age or older.  The average household size was 2.88 and the average family size was 3.35.

In the town, the population was spread out, with 30.1% under the age of 18, 5.1% from 18 to 24, 29.3% from 25 to 44, 21.7% from 45 to 64, and 13.8% who were 65 years of age or older.  The median age was 36 years. For every 100 females, there were 98.6 males.  For every 100 females age 18 and over, there were 85.6 males.

The median income for a household in the town was $39,500, and the median income for a family was $51,563. Males had a median income of $24,643 versus $29,583 for females. The per capita income for the town was $21,871.  About 3.1% of families and 4.8% of the population were below the poverty line, including 1.7% of those under the age of eighteen and 7.0% of those 65 or over.

As of 2000, speakers of English as a first language accounted for 91.30% of all residents, while Spanish as a mother tongue made up 8.69% of the population.

References

External links
 Town of Glen Ridge FL Official Website
 A Facebook page for the Town of Glen Ridge
 A brief history of Glen Ridge
 The page for Glen Ridge at the Palm Beach County Convention and Visitors Bureau

Towns in Palm Beach County, Florida
Towns in Florida